Café de Paris may refer to:

Establishments
Café de Paris (London), a London nightclub
Café de Paris, Chicago, a Chicago nightclub
Café de Paris (restaurant), Geneva
Café de Paris (Rome), a bar in Rome, Italy
Café de Paris (Cubzac-les-Ponts)
Café de Paris (Monaco)
Gran Café de París (Seville)
Gran Café De Paris (Tangier)

Film and television
Café de Paris (film), a 1938 film directed by Georges Lacombe
Café de Paris, a 1943 film directed by Edgar Neville
Café de Paris (TV series), an American variety show

See also
Café de Paris sauce, a complex butter-based sauce served with grilled meats, introduced at the Café de Paris in Geneva